Bernard L. McGinley was a judge of the Pennsylvania Commonwealth Court.

He attended John Carroll University and the University of Pittsburgh School of Law.  He worked as a judicial law clerk for the Allegheny County Court of Common Pleas.  He was an Assistant District Attorney for Allegheny County from 1971 to 1974.  He was an instructor of criminal law for the Allegheny County Community College from 1974 to 1975.  From 1975 to 1981 he was in private law practice.  He was Chairman of the Board of Viewers for Allegheny County from 1975 to 1980.  In 1981, he was elected judge of the Court of Common Pleas of Allegheny County in 1981.  In 1987, he was elected judge of the Commonwealth Court of Pennsylvania. He retired in 2016 after serving as a member of that court for 28 years.

References

Judges of the Commonwealth Court of Pennsylvania
Duquesne University alumni
Lawyers from Pittsburgh
Judges of the Pennsylvania Courts of Common Pleas
Living people
1946 births